Notes of Cases in points of practice, taken in the Court of Common Pleas, from M.T. 1732, to H.T. 1756, inclusive. To which is added a continuation of cases to the end of the reign of Geo. II. is the title of a collection of nominate reports, by Henry Barnes, of cases decided between approximately 1732 and 1760.

They are also known as Barnes' Notes of Practice. For the purpose of citation, their name may be abbreviated to "Barnes". They are reprinted in volume 94 of the English Reports.

J. G. Marvin said:

References
Notes of Cases in points of practice, taken in the Court of Common Pleas, from M.T. 1732, to H.T. 1756, inclusive. To which is added a continuation of cases to the end of the reign of Geo. II. 3d ed. 8vo. London. 1790.   from Google Books.

Sets of reports reprinted in the English Reports